The 2017 Colonial Athletic Association baseball tournament was held at Brooks Field in Wilmington, North Carolina, from May 24 through 27, 2017.  Fourth-seeded Delaware won the tournament for the first time and earned the Colonial Athletic Association's automatic bid to the 2017 NCAA Division I baseball tournament.

Entering the event, UNC Wilmington had won the most championships among active teams, with four.  James Madison and William & Mary had claimed two titles, while Towson and fourth-year member College of Charleston each had one.  Former member East Carolina won 7 titles during their tenure in the conference.

Seeding and format
Continuing the format adopted in 2012, the top six finishers from the regular season competed in the double-elimination tournament, with the top two seeds earning first round byes.

Bracket

All-Tournament Team
The following players were named to the All-Tournament Team.

Most Valuable Player
Jeremy Ake was named Tournament Most Valuable Player.  Ake was a shortstop for Delaware.

References

Tournament
Colonial Athletic Association Baseball Tournament
Colonial Athletic Association baseball tournament
Colonial Athletic Association baseball tournament
College baseball tournaments in North Carolina
Baseball competitions in Wilmington, North Carolina